Beatrice Fenton (July 12, 1887February 11, 1983) was an American sculptor and educator born in Philadelphia, Pennsylvania. She is best known for her whimsical fountains. Her work was also part of the sculpture event in the art competition at the 1932 Summer Olympics.

Early life and education 
Beatrice Fenton was born on July 12, 1887 in Philadelphia, Pennsylvania to Thomas Hanover and Lizzie Spear (Remak) F.

Inspired by the painter Rosa Bonheur, she decided to become an animalier and began drawing animals at the Philadelphia Zoo. Her father, Dr. Thomas Hanover Fenton, an art patron and head of the Art Club of Philadelphia, was impressed with the drawings and showed them to a family friend, Thomas Eakins. Eakins found the drawings “too flat” and suggested that she “get some clay and mold it.” Fenton enrolled in a sculpture class taught by A. Stirling Calder in 1903, and her future direction was set. She began her studies in 1904 at the School of Industrial Art, where she was taught by Alexander Stirling Calder. From 1904 to 1912, she studied with Charles Grafly at the Pennsylvania Academy of the Fine Arts in Philadelphia.

Career 
Fenton succeeded Samuel Murray as instructor in Sculpture at the Moore College of Art and Design (formerly the Philadelphia School of Art for Women), teaching there from 1942 to 1953.

Works by Fenton were shown at PAFA's annual exhibition most years from 1911 to 1964, and she was awarded the George D. Widener Memorial Gold Medal in 1922 for Seaweed Fountain. She was a member of the National Sculpture Society, and her Nereid Fountain was featured in the NSS exhibition of 1929.  A cast of Seaweed Fountain has been in the Brookgreen Gardens collection since 1934.

She died in Philadelphia in 1983.

Selected works

Personal life 
While studying at PAFA, Fenton met fellow artists Marjorie Martinet and Emily Clayton Bishop. Her relationship with Martinet lasted more than fifty years, and included the exchange of passionate letters.

References

External links

 Photographs of the Marjorie Martinet School of Art, George Glazer Gallery, New York City
 A Finding Aid to the Beatrice Fenton Papers, 1836-1984, bulk 1890-1978, in the Archives of American Art, by Jean Fitzgerald

1887 births
1983 deaths
Artists from Philadelphia
American women sculptors
Modern sculptors
20th-century American sculptors
20th-century American women artists
Moore College of Art and Design faculty
National Sculpture Society members
Sculptors from Pennsylvania
Olympic competitors in art competitions
American women academics